Michaela Detenamo is a Nauru weightlifter.

She competed at the 2010 Commonwealth Games, and the 2011 IWF World Championship.

References 

Nauruan female weightlifters
Year of birth missing (living people)
Living people